National Route 326 is a national highway of Japan connecting Nobeoka, Miyazaki and Bungo-ōno, Ōita in Japan, with a total length of 68.3 km (42.44 mi).

References

National highways in Japan
Roads in Miyazaki Prefecture
Roads in Ōita Prefecture